Common names: western bush viper, West African leaf viper, more.

Atheris chlorechis is a viper species found only in the forests of West Africa. No subspecies are currently recognized. It is the type species of its genus. It is venomous.

Description
The tail is relatively long. The body is relatively slender, with 25-36 midbody rows of dorsal scales. These are heavily keeled, with the keels ending in a swelling at the end of each scale.

Adults have a uniform light green ground color, overlaid with a series of faint yellow, roughly paired spots running dorsally along the length of the body and about 2.5 cm (about 1 in) apart. The belly is pale green in color. Newborns are tan-brown in color, but this changes to a yellow-green hue with irregular dark spots within 24 hours.

Common names
Western bush viper, West African leaf viper, West African tree viper.

Geographic range
Atheris chlorechis is found in West Africa from Sierra Leone through Guinea, Liberia, Ivory Coast, and Ghana to southern Togo. Records from Nigeria, Cameroon, and Gabon are considered erroneous. 

The type locality is listed as "Boutre, Ghana".

Habitat
Found in forests, in dense foliage about 1–2 m (about 3–6 ft) above the ground.

Feeding
Said to feed on rodents, lizards and tree frogs.

Reproduction
Gives birth to 6–9 young in March to April. Newborns are 131–151 mm (about 5–6 inches) in total length.

References

Further reading

Boulenger GA. 1896. Catalogue of the Snakes in the British Museum (Natural History). Volume III., Containing the...Viperidæ. London: Trustees of the British Museum (Natural History). (Taylor and Francis, printers.) xiv + 727 pp. + Plates I.- XXV. (Atheris chlorechis, pp. 508–509.)
Cansdale GS. 1961. West African Snakes. London: Longman's. 96 pp. .
 (Vipera chlorechis)

External links

 

chlorechis
Snakes of Africa
Reptiles of West Africa
Reptiles described in 1851